The men's high jump event at the 1994 Commonwealth Games was held on 23 and 26 August at the Centennial Stadium in Victoria, British Columbia.

Medalists

Results

Qualification

Qualification: 2.25 (Q) or 12 best performers (q) advance to the Final.

Final

References

High
1994